Pieter Gillis (28 July 1486 – 6 or 11 November 1533), known by his anglicised name Peter Giles and sometimes the Latinised Petrus Ægidius, was a humanist, printer, and secretary to the city of Antwerp in the early sixteenth century. He is most famous as a friend and supporter of Desiderius Erasmus and Thomas More. He seemed to have recommended the painter Hans Holbein the Younger to the court of England, where Thomas More received him delighted. 

Thomas More's Utopia, although fictional, includes Pieter Gillis as a character in Book I. More dedicated Utopia to Gillis, who may have designed the Utopian alphabet. They first met when diplomatic business brought More to Antwerp.

References

1486 births
1533 deaths
Flemish Renaissance humanists
Businesspeople from Antwerp
Constructed language creators
Creators of writing systems